Chong-Pal Park (Hangul: 박종팔, Hanja: 朴鍾八; born 11 August 1958) is a South Korean former professional boxer who held the IBF super-middleweight title from 1984 to 1988 and the WBA super-middleweight title from 1987 to 1988.

Professional career
Park turned professional in 1977 and won the Orient and Pacific Boxing Federation middleweight title in 1979. He also won the OPBF light-heavyweight title in 1983.

Park became world champion in the newly recognized super-middleweight division when he captured the Lineal and IBF super-middleweights titles in 1984 with an eleventh-round knockout over Murray Sutherland at Changchung Gymnasium, Seoul, South Korea. He defended the IBF title against six different contenders before relinquishing it in 1987 to fight for the vacant and newly created WBA title, defeating Jesus Gallardo. He defended the WBA title once before losing it to Fulgencio Obelmejias in 1988.

Park retired after losing his next fight to In-Chul Baek.

Professional boxing record

See also
List of super middleweight boxing champions
List of WBA world champions
List of IBF world champions

References

External links

Park Chong-pal - CBZ Profile

1960 births
International Boxing Federation champions
Living people
Middleweight boxers
Super-middleweight boxers
World Boxing Association champions
World super-middleweight boxing champions
South Korean male boxers
Sportspeople from South Jeolla Province